Saint-Privé may refer to:

Saint-Privé, Saône-et-Loire, a commune in the French region of Bourgogne
Saint-Privé, Yonne, a commune in the French region of Bourgogne